The Cursed Land is a novel by Teri McLaren published by Harper Prism in 1995.

Plot summary
The Cursed Land is a Magic: The Gathering novel in which a mysterious trader visits the island of Cridhe, turns one of the inhabitants against his friends and family and persuades him to try to take the power of the Clan Tree, the magical center of the islanders' world.

Reception
Andy Butcher reviewed The Cursed Land for Arcane magazine, rating it a 5 out of 10 overall. Butcher comments that "It's not that The Cursed Land is badly written. It's actually quite enjoyable, and mercifully avoids drawing too heavily on the specifics of Magic: The Gathering of which it is a spin-off. It's just that you've probably read so much of it before. In fact, if you've ever roleplayed in a fantasy game, you've probably played a lot of it before..."

References

1995 novels
Novels based on Magic: The Gathering